The 2022 World Rowing Junior Championships is the 55th edition of the World Rowing Junior Championships and was held from 27 July to 31 July 2022 in Varese, Italy along with the 2022 World Rowing U23 Championships.

Men's events

Women's events

Medal table

Participants 
A total of 674 rowers from the national teams of the following 51 countries was registered to compete at 2022 World Rowing Junior Championships.

 (1)
 (33)
 (8)
 (1)
 (3)
 (5)
 (18)
 (2)
 (23)
 (2)
 (7)
 (4)
 (18)
 (11)
 (12)
 (5)
 (20)
 (54)
 (37)
 (21)
 (19)
 (8)
 (54)
 (5)
 (3)
 (9)
 (4)
 (4)
 (4)
 (20)
 (25)
 (3)
 (1)
 (1)
 (23)
 (3)
 (42)
 (18)
 (3)
 (6)
 (14)
 (14)
 (2)
 (14)
 (4)
 (2)
 (9)
 (19)
 (54)
 (1)
 (1)

See also 
 2022 World Rowing Championships
 2022 World Rowing U23 Championships

References

External links 
 WorldRowing website

World Rowing Junior Championships
Rowing competitions in Italy
2022 in Italian sport
International sports competitions hosted by Italy
2022 in rowing
World Rowing